Methylatropine (trade name Eumydrin) is a belladonna derivative.

In 1902, the Bayer Company introduced methylatropine, a quaternary ammonium salt of atropine, as a mydriatic for dilation of the pupil during ophthalmic examination under the brand name of Eumydrin. Because of its highly polar nature it penetrated less readily into the central nervous system than did atropine; hence it was introduced for relieving pyloric spasm in infants.

The blocking potency of methylatropine is approximately 10-20 times higher than that of atropine at neuromuscular and ganglionic synapses.

See also
 Apoatropine

References

Muscarinic antagonists
Quaternary ammonium compounds
Tropanes
Primary alcohols
Carboxylate esters